Scenes from the Goldmine is a 1987 American film directed by Marc Rocco.

Plot
A female songwriter is invited to join a rock band. She's thrilled at first to be near the rock band's handsome leader. They embark upon an affair until she discovers he is stealing her songs.

Cast
Catherine Mary Stewart as Debi DiAngelo
Cameron Dye as Niles Dresden
Steve Railsback as Harry Spiros
Joe Pantoliano as Manny Ricci
Alex Rocco as Nathan DiAngelo
Lee Ving as Ian Weymouth
John Ford Coley as Kenny Bond
Timothy B. Schmit as Dennis Lameraux
Jewel Shepard as Dana
Pamela Springsteen as Stephanie
James House as Simon LeGree
Melissa Etheridge as Shop Clerk
Nick Gilder as himself
Lesley-Anne Down as Lady Lesley-Anne Down

References

External links

1987 films
American romantic musical films
1980s romantic musical films
1987 directorial debut films
1980s English-language films
1980s American films